Bart T. Blackwell (born September 14, 1960) is an American politician. He is a member of the South Carolina House of Representatives from the 81st District, serving since 2016. He is a member of the Republican party.

Electoral history

References

Living people
1960 births
Republican Party members of the South Carolina House of Representatives
21st-century American politicians
College of Charleston alumni
University of Southern California alumni